Mameshbirde (died 1556) was a rebel commander during Kazan War for the independence of Kazan Khanate in 1552–1556. As legend says, he was a son of Mari noble and Chuvash noble woman.

Some years after the fall of Kazan, in 1555 Mameshbirde gathered a military unit and started to struggle against Russian invaders on both banks of the Volga. At the Hill Bank Land of the Volga his army reconstructed Çalım, the old stronghold at the Sender (Sundyr) Hill and based there. Mameshbirde tried to restore the khanate, but as he wasn't one of Genghiside, he needed someone to head the khanate. He invited the Nogay noble Ğäli Äkräm. After their joint armies were defeated by Russian punitive expedition in 1556, he was captured. Later he was executed in Moscow.

References

1556 deaths
16th-century executions by Russia
Chuvash people
Mari people
Russo-Kazan Wars
Year of birth unknown